The Erich Fried Prize is a literary prize in honour of the Austrian poet Erich Fried, and is awarded annually by the  for Literature and Language, based in Vienna. The value of the prize, endowed by the office of the Chancellor of Austria, is 15,600 euros. Each year the trustees of the Erich Fried Society select a juror, who nominates the winner of the prize for that year.

Jurors and Recipients

See also 
 German literature
 List of literary awards
 List of poetry awards

References

External links 
 
 Erich Fried Preis (in German)
 Internationales Literaturfestival Erich Fried Tage (in German)
 Internationale Erich Fried Gesellschaft (in German)

Austrian culture
Austrian literature
Austrian literary awards